Tajikistan competed at the 2004 Summer Paralympics in Athens, Greece. The team included one athlete,  but won no medals.

Sports

Powerlifting

See also
Tajikistan at the Paralympics
Tajikistan at the 2004 Summer Olympics

References 

Nations at the 2004 Summer Paralympics
2004
Summer Paralympics